Podlesnaya Tavla (Viŕ Tavla) is a rural locality (a selo) in Kochkurovsky District of the Republic of Mordovia, Russia. Population:

References

Rural localities in Mordovia
Kochkurovsky District